Frank Albo is a Canadian architectural historian. He is the academic inspiration behind The Hermetic Code (2007) and the author of Astana: Architecture, Myth, and Destiny (2017). Albo is currently an Adjunct Professor of History at the University of Winnipeg where he specializes in architecture, Freemasonry, and the Western esoteric tradition.

For his discoveries into the Freemasonic symbolism of the Manitoba Legislative Building recounted in The Hermetic Code, Albo has been dubbed "Canada's Dan Brown" and "one of Winnipeg's foremost architectural historians". Since 2009, Albo has led the Hermetic Code Tours of the Manitoba Legislative Building, which more than 45,000 people have attended.

Early life and education
Albo grew up in the West End of Winnipeg, Manitoba, Canada. He completed his Bachelor of Arts degree in religion and anthropology at the University of Winnipeg in 2002. He continued his studies at the University of Toronto, where he was awarded a Master of Arts (MA) degree in ancient Near Eastern civilizations following completion of a thesis entitled Nebuchadrezzar and  the  Stars:  A  New  Perspective  of the  Theophany  in  the  Book  of Habakkuk 3:3–13. He acquired a second MA degree in Hermetic philosophy and related currents at the University of Amsterdam in 2006. His thesis was entitled Ritualist Revival: Fin de siècle Esotericism and the Oxford Movement. He started attending Peterhouse, University of Cambridge, in 2007, where he attained his Master of Philosophy degree in the history of art in 2008 with the thesis Charles Robert Cockerell and his Theories of Gothic Proportions from his Lectures at the Royal Academy and then a Doctor of Philosophy degree in the history of architecture in 2012 with the thesis Freemasonry and the Nineteenth-Century British Gothic Revival.

Publications

Hermetic Code

In 2001, Albo began his decade-long research into the Freemasonic and Hermetic symbolism of the Manitoba Legislative Building after noticing two Egyptian sphinxes on the building's roof. Albo received government funding and support to conduct extensive research and freely explore the building, which enabled him to uncover its esoteric principles of design. This included hidden hieroglyphic inscriptions and the architect's emulation of Solomon's Temple, and the architect's use of sacred geometry, and numerological codes, including the golden ratio, the Fibonacci sequence, and a tribute to the numbers "666" and "13". Albo concluded that British architect Frank Worthington Simon, himself a Freemason, had designed the edifice as "a temple [to Hermetic wisdom] masquerading as a government building."

Albo's discoveries became the basis for Carolin Vesely and Buzz Currie's 2007 book The Hermetic Code, which was published by the Winnipeg Free Press and is now on its fourth printing. Since 2009, Albo has led the Hermetic Code Tours through the Manitoba Legislative Building, which more than 25,000 have taken. In 2011, the Canadian Tourism Commission announced that it had added the Hermetic Code Tour to its list of premiere destinations as part of its international tourism campaign. Writing about the Hermetic Code Tour in The Sydney Morning Herald, Max Anderson says, "Frank Albo – a highly charismatic polymath – leads one of the very best tours of any public building anywhere in the world."

Astana: Architecture, Myth & Destiny
Albo has continued his research into esoteric matters with his 2017 book Astana: Architecture, Myth & Destiny. In this work, he posits that the architecture of Astana, Kazakhstan, dubbed the "Illuminati Capital of the World", encodes a solution to the three greatest threats of the 21st century: religious extremism, environmental destruction, and the proliferation of nuclear weapons. The book also conceals an armchair treasure hunt called the Astana Challenge, an enigma of secrets and mysteries that when solved reveals a hidden message.

Bibliography

References

External links

Year of birth missing (living people)
Living people
Architectural historians
Writers from Winnipeg
Academic staff of University of Winnipeg
Alumni of Peterhouse, Cambridge
University of Winnipeg alumni
University of Toronto alumni